The 5th Pennsylvania House of Representatives District is in southeastern Pennsylvania and has been represented by Barry Jozwiak since 2014.

District profile
Located in Berks County, the 5th Pennsylvania House of Representatives District includes the following areas:

Bern Township
Bernville
Bethel Township
Centre Township
Centerport
Heidelberg Township
Jefferson Township
Leesport
Lower Heidelberg Township
Marion Township
North Heidelberg Township
Ontelaunee Township
Penn Township
Perry Township
Robesonia
Shoemakersville
South Heidelberg Township
Spring Township (part)
District 05
District 07
District 08
Tulpehocken Township
Wernersville
Womelsdorf

Representatives

Recent election results

References

External links
District map from the United States Census Bureau
Pennsylvania House Legislative District Maps from the Pennsylvania Redistricting Commission.  
Population Data for District 5 from the Pennsylvania Redistricting Commission.

Government of Allegheny County, Pennsylvania
5